Persons Unknown is a 1929 mystery play by the British writer Edgar Wallace. The plot revolves around the murder of a "person unknown" in a street by a mysterious blackmailer. It features the character of Sergeant Elk, a Scotland Yard detective who appeared in several of Wallace's novels.

Its original run lasted for twelve performances at the Regent Theatre in London. The original cast included Bernard Lee.

References

Bibliography
 Kabatchnik, Amnon. Blood on the Stage, 1975-2000: Milestone Plays of Crime, Mystery, and Detection : an Annotated Repertoire. Rowman & Littlefield, 2012.
 Wearing, J. P. The London Stage 1920-1929: A Calendar of Productions, Performers, and Personnel. Rowman & Littlefield, 2014.

1929 plays
Plays by Edgar Wallace
Plays set in England
West End plays